The 1958–1975 Wollo–Tigray famine was a provincial, and later nationwide, series of famines in the Ethiopian Empire during the reign of Emperor Haile Selassie. The first famine was reported in Tigray Province in 1958, after prolonged negligence of the imperial government for years until a report of Were Ilu famine to the Ministry of the Interior in 1965. In November 1965, after the situation came to light to police, the information reached the Emperor taking 320 days, and the Emperor reinforced the Ministry of the Interior to respond to local Wollo officials for enlisting the victims of the famine.

The famine widely ravaged the two provinces as well as converging areas such as Afar-inhabited arid region by early 1972. During the 1972 and 1973, the famine killed between 40,000 and 80,000 people. In response, the government initiated the Relief and Rehabilitation Commission (RRC), a department that aim to reduce the famine severity and coordinate international assistance.

The famine led mobilization of pastoralists and nomads in general, while alluring advantage to feudal landlords that forced tenants to pay large rents while escorting their retinue of armed guards. 

The Wollo famine is regarded as the main cause of Haile Selassie government collapse.  It has been estimated that the death toll reached 250,000 people in 1975. This has coupled peasants revolution in Ethiopia, continued through the successive Derg regime. Notable of such incident was the rebellion of Dejazmach Berhane Meskel, who assaults the former landlords and government security forces, as well as attacked the Derg government for years.

Event

1958–1973 Wollo–Tigray famine
The first wave of famine occurred in Tigray Province in 1958, without significant government relief. In 1965/1966, report of the famine in Were Ilu reached the Ministry of the Interior in November 1965, a month after the situation was lit to the police without any measure. The information took 320 days to reach the Emperor, who then reinforced the Ministry to respond to local Wollo officials to enlist the victims of the famine. There was also a small relief effort in regard to security problems.  

The 1958 and 1965/6 years killed tens of thousands of people during the famine. During the year of 1972/1973, Wollo struck by famine killing between 40,000 and 80,000 people. In response, the government established a department named Relief and Rehabilitation Commission (RRC) to reduce future famines and coordinate international assistance. The Wollo famine widely blamed on drought, directly resulted from government backward response, impoverished social system, and coverup by the government. 

The famine also affected Afar pastoralists during early 1972. The Afars used posture over the large area to support their herds. The drought forced them to move in Tcheffa Valley, on the rift valley escarpment, and pasture along the inland delta of the Awash River where water was abandoned to the desert. The valley was the location of sorghum farmland in 1960s, where small farmers in vicinity moved to the area for commerce. Meanwhile, large cotton plantations developed along Awash River. By 1972, 50,000 hectares of irrigated land had displaced 20,000 Afar pastoralists. In the early 1970s, the Afar mobility was restricted by supply of weaponry to their neighbor nomads and competitors, the Issa who were ethnic Somali.  

The second group suffered from the severe famine were farmers residing in middle altitude of north-central Wollo Province, who were tenants. The Raya and Azebo Oromos, who were dominant position in opposition during the Woyane Rebellion, experienced land alienation, while other forced to mortgage or sell their land in response to distress of strived harvest failures in the early 1970s. Landlords took advantage of tenants' destitution by forcing them to pay large rents, often in-kind manner. The demand actually transformed by coercion as influential landlords had retinue of armed guards. As a result, the famine area exported grain to provincial capital, Dessie and to Addis Ababa in 1973.   

At the latter point, the peasants and nomads of Wollo began sabotaging Haile Selassie reputation by starving, and resolved to ignore them.

1975 Northern rebellions
The Wollo famine contributed to Haile Selassie's government collapse, not only the hunger among peasants and nomads, but also swept among the students and middle classes of Addis Ababa. In the early 1970s, there was peasant revolution involving feudal leaders in each of the northern provinces; the Wollo group revolt was led by a feudal lord Dejazmach Berhane Meskel. After the fall of Haile Selassie government following the Ethiopian Revolution, he destroyed Ethiopian Airlines DC–3 at Lalibela on 14 March 1975. Again, he rallied supporters in October after spree killings of the former landlords by peasants and government security officers.  

Berhane's force were eventually defeated by the Derg militia and air force attacks near Woldiya in December 1975, but continued rebellion against the government for years.

References

Famines in Ethiopia
Famines in Africa
Haile Selassie
History of Ethiopia
20th century in Ethiopia
20th century in Africa
20th-century famines